Satureja spicigera, the creeping savory, is a species of flowering plant in the family Lamiaceae. It is native to northeastern Turkey, the Caucasus, and northwestern Iran. A perennial prostrate shrub, hardy in USDA zones 6 through 9, it is recommended as an edging plant for rock and herb gardens. Used as a culinary herb, both fresh and dried, its flavor is similar to winter savory, Satureja montana, as it is stronger than summer savory, Satureja hortensis.

References

Lamiaceae
Herbs
Flora of Turkey
Flora of the Caucasus
Flora of Iran
Plants described in 1879